Louis Delgrès (2 August 1766 – 28 May 1802) was a leader of the movement in Guadeloupe resisting reoccupation and thus the reinstitution of slavery by Napoleonic France in 1802.

Biography
Delgrès was mulatto, born free in Saint-Pierre, Martinique. A military officer for Revolutionary France experienced in the wars with Great Britain, Delgrès took over the resistance movement from Magloire Pélage after it became evident that Pélage was loyal to Napoleon.  Delgrès believed that the "tyrant" Napoleon had betrayed both the ideals of the Republic and the interests of France's colored citizens, and intended to fight to the death. The Jacobin government had granted the slaves their freedom, in Guadeloupe and other French colonies, but Napoleon attempted to reinstate slavery throughout the French Empire in 1802.

The French army, led by Richepanse, drove Delgrès into Fort Saint Charles, which was held by formerly enslaved Guadeloupians. After realizing that he could not prevail and refusing to surrender, Delgrès was left with roughly 1000 men and some women.

At the Battle of Matouba on 28 May 1802, Delgrès and his followers ignited their gunpowder stores, committing suicide in the process, in an attempt to kill as many of the French troops as possible.

Legacy and honours
In April 1998, Delgrès was officially admitted to the French Panthéon, although the actual location of his remains is unknown. Delgrès' memorial is opposite that of Toussaint Louverture, leader of the Haitian Revolution, the location of whose remains is also a mystery.

Located near the Fort Delgrès, in Basse-Terre, Guadeloupe, a memorial bust of  Delgrès was erected during the bicentennial of the rebellion, in 2002.

The contemporary French Caribbean blues trio Delgres is named after Delgrès.

See also 
 La Mulâtresse Solitude
 History of Guadeloupe
 Colonialism
 Siege of Masada (a similar mass suicide)

References

External links
 Louis Delgrès Le souffle de la liberté 

1766 births
1802 deaths
People from Saint-Pierre, Martinique
19th-century French politicians
French abolitionists
19th century in Guadeloupe
History of Guadeloupe